Heroes of Newerth (HoN) was a multiplayer online battle arena (MOBA) video game originally developed by S2 Games for Microsoft Windows, Mac OS X, and Linux. The game idea was derived from the Warcraft III: The Frozen Throne custom map Defense of the Ancients and was S2 Games' first MOBA title. The game was released on May 12, 2010, and re-released as a free-to-play game on July 29, 2011. On May 5, 2015, Heroes of Newerth development duties passed to Frostburn Studios, with the development team moving over to the new company. The service ceased operations on June 20, 2022.

Gameplay
Heroes of Newerth pits two teams of players against each other: the Legion and the Hellbourne. Both teams are based at opposite corners of the map in their respective bases. Bases consist of buildings, barracks, towers, a hero spawning pool, and a central structure. The goal of the game is to either destroy the central structure, the World Tree (Legion) or Sacrificial Shrine (Hellbourne), of the opposite base or force the other team to concede. Players achieve this by selecting heroes with unique skills to combat the other team.

Game starts with hero picking phase. There are picking modes to allow players to create teams with balanced functionality. Heroes fill different roles in teams. Heroes can specialize in dealing damage, tanking, crowd control, healing, destroying towers, farming, defending, harassing, initiating fights, empowering nearby allies, providing vision, seeking and revealing enemies, killing kongor and so on. Heroes can fulfill many of these roles in different degrees. Typical roles are Carry, Support, Ganker, Jungler and Suicide. Players can choose to fill multiple roles at the same time.

After the game starts, players need gold and experience to get stronger over time. To achieve this, players initially need to go to lanes, jungle, kongor's pit or one of golem's pits. Experience is gained by seeing an enemy soldier, hero, neutral creature, kongor or golem die, from a predefined range. Purple dots on creeps indicate whether the player is close enough to gain experience when the creep dies. Gold is gained by killing or assisting the killing of enemy soldiers, heroes, creatures, devices, kongor or golem. As players level up, they choose an ability to level up, or level up stats, which gives +2 to agility, intelligence and strength. The maximum hero level is 25.

Each player typically plays one hero. Players can allow each other to control their own heroes. Some heroes can spawn or summon pets, creatures or devices. Heroes typically have four abilities. The default keys for abilities are Q,W,E and R. Sometimes the D key is used for the fifth ability. The fourth ability is the ultimate ability.

, there are 139 playable heroes. Each game, a player chooses one hero to be for the duration of the match. Most heroes have four abilities that may be acquired and upgraded as the hero gains experience and levels up, defaulted to keys "Q", "W", "E", and "R". An ability can be leveled up whenever the hero's level goes up. "R" is the hero's ultimate and can only be leveled up when the hero reaches level 6 except for some heroes.

Heroes are grouped by their main attribute. The three types are Agility, Intelligence, and Strength. Usually, Agility heroes rely on their basic attacks and go for damage per second (DPS) and increase their armor and attack speed. Intelligence heroes maximize the use of their abilities and try to maximize the amount of Mana they have and Mana regeneration. Strength heroes can take the most damage and increase their Max Health and Health regeneration.

Heroes also are grouped by their attack type. The two attack types are melee and ranged. Melee heroes have short attack range and ranged heroes have long attack range. Ranged heroes have varying attack ranges. Abilities have their own ranges.

Development
Development started in 2005. In October 2009, associate game designer Alan "Idejder" Cacciamani claimed that Heroes of Newerth had been in development for "34 months, but the first 13 were spent on engine development. The entirety of assets, including maps, items, heroes, and art were made in 21 months".

New features, balance changes and new heroes are regularly introduced with patches. Most game mechanics and many heroes in Heroes of Newerth are heavily based on Defense of the Ancients. The additions that differentiate Heroes of Newerth from Defense of the Ancients are features independent from gameplay; such as tracking of individual statistics, in-game voice communication, GUI-streamlined hero selection, game reconnection, match making, player banlists, penalties for leaving and chat features. Several features added via updates include a Hero Compendium (a list of the heroes in the game with detailed statistics about them), the ability to set a "following" trait on a friend which makes the player join/leave the games that a friend joins (similar to the "party" feature in other games), an in-game ladder system, and a map editor. The game uses S2 Games' proprietary K2 Engine and a client-server model similar to that used in other multiplayer games.

Heroes of Newerth was in beta from April 24, 2009, until May 12, 2010. Throughout this time, over 3,000,000 unique accounts were registered. S2 Games used a Facebook fan page and word of mouth to attract players to the game. Many people who had bought one of S2 Games' previous games also received an invitation to the game through their registered email.

On August 22, 2009, the pre-sale of Heroes of Newerth began for members of the closed beta. Players who purchased the game at this time received additional benefits, including name reservation, gold-colored nameplate, gold shield insignia, and an in-game taunt ability. Open beta testing for Heroes of Newerth began on March 31, 2010, and ran until May 12, 2010, when the game was released.

S2 Games released Heroes of Newerth 2.0 on December 13, 2010. Features included in the update were casual mode, a new user interface, team matchmaking, an in-game store, and an offline map editor. Microtransactions were also introduced via the in-game store with the use of coins. Coins can be used to purchase cosmetic changes within the game, such as alternative hero skins, avatars, and customized announcer voices. The in-game currency can either be purchased with real life currency or earned via Matchmaking games.

S2 Games released Heroes of Newerth as a free-to-play game on July 29, 2011. Accounts that were purchased before this date retained access to all content and updates without additional charges. Accounts made after this had 15 free-rotating heroes to choose from; the 15 heroes rotated every week. These accounts only had access to the game mode All Pick. Through purchasing coins or earning them in play, players could purchase the ability to use additional heroes. Players had to pay for tokens to play additional game modes, so that they could temporarily have the hero pool available to provide balance in hero selection.

On July 19, 2012, nearly one year after announcing its free-to-play model S2 Games announced publicly that the game would be completely free to play with no restrictions to hero access, excluding Early Access to yet to be released heroes. The in-game store pricing was also reworked to allow easier access to in-game cosmetic content.

In October 2012, S2 Games announced HoN Tour, an automated tournament system built into the game. The tournament is open to anyone and players compete to earn real money. The first "cycle" of the event began the weekend of December 1.

In December 2012, Heroes of Newerth was hacked with over 8 million accounts being breached. The compromised data included usernames, email addresses and passwords. The hack was announced by the perpetrator themself on Reddit with S2 Games later confirming the breach.

On May 1, 2013, S2 Games released Heroes of Newerth 3.0. Version 3.0 significantly updated the game's graphics, added bots, and dramatically improved features for introducing new players to the game. Part of the change features different looking lanes, cliffs, and towers. Heroes as well, look sharper and more detailed. The features for new players include tutorial videos and AI bots for a stress-free playing environment.

On May 5, 2015, it was announced that Garena had acquired Heroes of Newerth from S2 Games, and established FrostBurn Studios to handle development of the game. Many of previous S2 Games staff members who help develop and maintain the game were subsequently employed by the new FrostBurn studios.

On November 6, 2020, Frostburn Studios released the HoN 64-Bit Client, that should result in a much more stable experience for those on the Latest Windows (10), most notably faster FPS, and reduced loading times.

On February 9, 2021, a macOS 64-Bit Universal client was announced to be getting into closed beta.

In the recent years, the game has been getting patches every 8 weeks aimed at improving game balance, bug fixing, and occasionally bringing new hero avatars and items, with 4.9.2. being the latest version that went live on March 30, 2021.

On December 15, 2021, HoN's developers announced that the game will be shut down on June 20, 2022.

Despite the official shutdown, HoN is still playable with community's support.

Reception

Heroes of Newerth has received generally positive reviews, with a score of 76 out of 100 from Metacritic. Reviews have generally praised the technical aspects of the game, while criticizing the harsh learning curve and the commonly critical nature of the community. When Heroes of Newerth became free-to-play on July 29, 2011, the game had accumulated over 526,000 paid accounts with 460,000 unique players. The number of concurrent players online has also steadily increased over time, peaking at 150,000 as of May 2013. In mid-2013, Heroes of Newerth was the third most played game in internet cafés in the Philippines. Laura Baker, the director of marketing for S2 Games, stated that both the "Mac and Linux clients have done well for us."

See also
 Savage: The Battle for Newerth
 Savage 2: A Tortured Soul
 Strife

References

External links
 

2010 video games
Esports games
Free-to-play video games
Independent Games Festival winners
Linux games
Lua (programming language)-scripted video games
MacOS games
Multiplayer online battle arena games
Multiplayer online games
Inactive multiplayer online games
Multiplayer video games
Online games
Products and services discontinued in 2022
S2 Games
Video game clones
Video games developed in the United States
Windows games
Garena games